List of MPs for constituencies in Northern Ireland may refer to:
 List of MPs for constituencies in Northern Ireland (2019–present)
 List of MPs for constituencies in Northern Ireland (2017–2019)
 List of MPs for constituencies in Northern Ireland (2015–2017)
 List of MPs for constituencies in Northern Ireland (2010–2015)
 List of MPs for constituencies in Northern Ireland (2005–2010)